Menamkulam is a suburb in Trivandrum City the capital of state of Kerala, India. It is the part of Kadinamkulam Panchayat. The headquarters of women's battalion of Kerala Police is situated in menamkulam.

It is  Technopark and Kazhakoottam railway station. 

Menamkulam was home for 2015 national games. Institutions like Kinfra industrial park, Marian engineering college, and St. Xavier college are located here..The main attraction of this place is the Thookam festival of Sree Palkara Bhagavathy Temple[aka Elayil Temple]which is being held in the month of March-April where people from various places visit to see it.

List of temples and churches:

Bethel Marthoma Church

Sree Palkara Bhagavathy Temple

Vilayil Sree Mahavishnu Thampuran Temple

Naagamandalam Sree Dharmasastha Temple

Ardhanaareeshwara Samadhi Temple

Demographics 
 India census, Kazhakkoottam-Menamkulam (village) had a population of 20,209, with 10,027 males and 10,182 females.

References

Villages in Thiruvananthapuram district